Ryan Andrew Quigley (born January 26, 1990) is a former American football punter. He was signed by the Chicago Bears after going undrafted in the 2012 NFL Draft. He played college football at Boston College.

He has played for the New York Jets, Philadelphia Eagles, Jacksonville Jaguars, Arizona Cardinals, and Minnesota Vikings.

Early life
Quigley attended North Myrtle Beach High School, where he played for the football team. In his senior year, Quigley led the state of South Carolina in yards per punt with 46. He also played kicker, and made six of eight field goals, and kicked 93 percent of his kickoffs for touchbacks. He was later named first-team All-State by the Associated Press along with being named the South Carolina Special Teams Player of the Year.

College career
Quigley attended Boston College. As a freshman in 2008, he finished with 59 punts for 2,334 net yards for a 39.6 average. In 2009, Quigley broke the school record for the most punts in a season with 77, and he would later break the record a year later with 79. Overall, in the 2009 season, he finished with 77 punts for 3,145 net yards for a 40.8 average. As a junior in 2010, he finished with 79 punts for 3,282 net yards for a 41.5 average. In his senior year, he was ranked fourth in the nation for punts inside the 20-yard line with 28. Overall, in the 2011 season, he finished with 69 punts for 2,657 net yards for a 38.5 average. He is the school's all-time leader in career punts with 283 punts for 11,418 yards.

Professional career

Chicago Bears
Quigley was signed by the Chicago Bears after the Draft. He replaced Adam Podlesh at punter for the preseason after Podlesh sustained a hip flexor against the Washington Redskins in the second preseason game. Against the New York Giants in the third preseason game, he had three of his seven punts land inside the 20-yard line, and the Giants were only able to muster six yards on four returns. However, Quigley also had a punt blocked to set up a Giants touchdown, though the Bears would go on to win 20–17. He later made the 53-man roster. However, Podlesh ended up punting in the season opener against the Indianapolis Colts. Quigley was waived on September 10.

New York Jets
On April 11, 2013, Quigley signed with the New York Jets. He was released on August 26, 2013. He was re-signed on September 16, 2013, after the Jets released Robert Malone.

On September 22, 2013, Quigley made his NFL debut against the Buffalo Bills. He finished the game with seven punts for 294 net yards for a 42.00 average. Overall, in the 2013 season, he finished with 72 punts for 3,278 net yards for a 45.5 average.

In the 2014 season, Quigley finished with 78 punts for 3,580 net yards for a 45.9 average.

In Week 9 of the 2015 season, Quigley was named the AFC Special Team's Player of the Week against the Jacksonville Jaguars.  Filling in as placekicker after Nick Folk suffered a season-ending injury in pregame warmups, he made all four extra points in addition to placing five punts inside the 20. Overall, in the 2015 season, he finished with 75 punts for 3,287 net yards for a 43.8 average.

Philadelphia Eagles
Quigley signed with the Philadelphia Eagles on April 18, 2016. Quigley was released by the team on May 23, 2016.

Jacksonville Jaguars
On June 16, 2016, Quigley was signed by the Jacksonville Jaguars. On August 29, 2016, he was waived by the Jaguars.

Arizona Cardinals
On September 28, 2016, Quigley was signed by the Arizona Cardinals. On November 15, 2016, he was released by the Cardinals. In his time with the Cardinals in the 2016 season, he had 34 punts for 1,416 net yards for a 41.6 average.

Minnesota Vikings
On April 3, 2017, Quigley signed with the Minnesota Vikings. Overall, in the 2017 season, he finished with 71 punts for 2,994 net yards for a 42.2 average.

On September 2, 2018, Quigley was released by the Minnesota Vikings prior to the start of the season after the team acquired Matt Wile.

References

External links
 Boston College Eagles bio
 Chicago Bears bio
 New York Jets bio 

Living people
1990 births
Sportspeople from South Carolina
American football punters
Boston College Eagles football players
Chicago Bears players
New York Jets players
People from North Myrtle Beach, South Carolina
Philadelphia Eagles players
Jacksonville Jaguars players
Arizona Cardinals players
Minnesota Vikings players